George Adams (born 1 July 1950) is a Scottish football player and coach.

While he was a player, Adams was Alex Ferguson's first signing as a manager, moving to East Stirlingshire from Alloa Athletic in 1974. His playing career was disrupted by injury, and he became a manager in the Highland Football League at a young age.

Adams later worked for Alex Ferguson as a youth coach at Aberdeen. He was later credited by Rangers chairman John McClelland for bringing through many of the players who enjoyed great success with Aberdeen during the 1980s. Adams subsequently worked in youth development for Celtic and Motherwell.

Adams left Motherwell in 2003 to become director of youth football at Rangers. He left Rangers in September 2005 after being offered a different post as part of a restructuring exercise at the club. Adams blamed a personality clash with chief executive Martin Bain as the reason for his departure.

Later in 2005, Adams joined Ross County as director of football. In 2007, Adams appointed his son (Derek Adams) as Ross County manager. The father and son pairing guided Ross County to the 2010 Scottish Cup Final, recording upset victories over Hibernian and Celtic en route. The pairing were split when Adams left Ross County to become assistant manager to Colin Calderwood at Hibernian, but were reunited again when Derek Adams returned as Ross County manager in 2011. Both father and son were sacked by Ross County in August 2014.

Personal life 

Adams was Sir Alex Ferguson first signing as a Manager. He has a son and daughter called Derek and Leigh-Anne.

References

External links 

1950 births
Living people
Footballers from Glasgow
Scottish football managers
Aberdeen F.C. players
Partick Thistle F.C. players
Stranraer F.C. players
Alloa Athletic F.C. players
East Stirlingshire F.C. players
Scottish Football League players
Association football forwards
Aberdeen F.C. non-playing staff
Rangers F.C. non-playing staff
Peterhead F.C. managers
Motherwell F.C. non-playing staff
Celtic F.C. non-playing staff
Petershill F.C. players
Scottish footballers
Scottish Christians
Highland Football League managers
Association football coaches
Ross County F.C. non-playing staff
Scottish Junior Football Association players